Blanchard is an unincorporated community in Sussex County, Delaware, United States. Blanchard is located at the intersection of Blanchard Road and Farm Lane, northwest of Greenwood.

References

Unincorporated communities in Sussex County, Delaware
Unincorporated communities in Delaware